Markus Herberg is a German curler and curling coach.

At the national level, he is a 1993 German men's champion curler.

Teams

Record as a coach of national teams

References

External links

Living people
German male curlers
German curling champions
Sportspeople from Bavaria
German curling coaches
Year of birth missing (living people)
Place of birth missing (living people)